Arturo Alfonso González González (born 5 September 1994), also known as Ponchito, is a Mexican professional footballer who plays as a midfielder for Liga MX club Monterrey.

Participating for the national team throughout various age groups, González was part of the team that won the 2011 U-17 World Cup. He made his debut with the senior Mexico national team in 2014 in a friendly match against Honduras.

Early life
Arturo González was born in Reynosa, Tamaulipas to Luis Enrique González and Irma González. As a child, he played baseball, the most popular sport in his hometown, However, after breaking an arm he began training in football. In December 2008 and January 2009 he went to the US city of Mission, Texas to try out for the youth team of Atlas. with a positive verdict from the coaches, he joined to the club's youth academy in 2009. After 2 years with the Youth Academy, he was called up to represent Mexico in the 2011 U17 World Cup, after good performances the youth team of Atlas during the 2010–11 season.

Club career

Atlas

2011–2012
González made his senior debut with Atlas on 18 February 2012 against Tigres UANL coming in as a substitute for Alonso Zamora in the 65th minute of the game. He also made another appearance against Jaguares summing 2 appearances during the Clausura 2012 season.

2012–2013
González played his first match in the Apertura 2012 against Tigres UANL coming in the 65th minute. He appeared in the match against San Luis coming on the 53rd minute, which they lost 3–2. He came on for the second half of the Clasico Tapatio match against Guadalajara, which they lost 2–0. He played all 90 minutes against Puebla scoring his first goal in a 2–2 draw. He played the last match against León losing 3–1.

He played the first match in the Clausura 2013 against Pumas coming on in the 39th minute in a 1–1 draw. He played in the match against León losing 1–0. He played in 2 of 19 matches, which Atlas lost in the quarter-finals to Santos Laguna on a 3–1 aggerate.

2013–2014
He made his Apertura 2013 debut against Guadalajara on a 1–1 draw. His next game against Cruz Azul scoring a goal, but losing 2–1. He appeared against Pachuca losing 2–0. He appeared on the final game of the semester losing to Tigres 1–0.

For the Clausura 2014 he started to be a regular and contributing to the team and scoring 3 goals against Morelia, Pumas, and Jaguares. He played a total of 1,315 minutes.

2014–2015
He played in the first match against Tigres on a 0–0 draw. He took part in the 2–0 win over Morelia. In the third match against Jaguares, he scored a spectacular free kick goal in a 4–2 win. He was the man of the match in the game against Pumas after scoring the only goal of the match. He played against Leones Negros on a derby in a 1–0 win in a last-minute win penalty scored by Luis Nery Caballero. He played against Pachuca in a 3–1 loss, scoring a goal. He played against Santos in a 1–1 draw. He played all 90 minutes against Veracruz in another 1–1 draw. He played in a home win against Cruz Azul scoring a goal with a header. He played against Monterrey in a 2–1 away loss. He played against Querétaro in a 2–1 win. He played the Clasico Tapatío against Chivas winning 1–0 with a goal scored from Enrique Pérez.

2015–2016
On 1 July 2016, his move to Monterrey was confirmed.

Monterrey

2016–2017
On March 22, 2017, he scored a goal in a friendly match against Rio Grande Valley FC Toros to open their new HEB stadium. It was the second goal ever in the history of the stadium.

2017–2018
In August, he suffered a cruciate ligament tear in his right knee which left him out of the season.

2019–2020
With Monterrey's victory of the 2019–20 Copa MX, they had obtained the continental treble.

International career

Youth
Arturo Competed in the 2011 U-17 World Cup in Mexico. He was given the number 10 shirt for the tournament, and scored his first and only goal of the tournament against Netherlands in the last minutes of the match breaking the tie, and clinching a 3–2 victory for Mexico. He would help the national team reach the final against Uruguay, where he assisted teammate Giovanni Casillas in the last few minutes in a 2–0 victory in the Azteca.

Arturo was left out of the squad for the 2013 CONCACAF U-20 Championship by coach Sergio Almaguer. However, he appeared in the 2013 FIFA U-20 World Cup hosted in Turkey, appearing in all 4 matches and scoring one goal against Spain in the knockout stage, However, it wasn't enough since Mexico lost 1–2 and were eliminated from the tournament. Gonzalez also appeared in the 2013 and 2014 editions of the Toulon Tournament.

Senior
González received his first call-up to the senior national team on 1 October 2014, for two friendly matches against Honduras on 9 October, and Panama on 11 October 2014. He made his debut against Honduras coming in for Marco Fabián in the 76th minute of the game. Arturo became the first youth player from the 2011 U-17 national team squad to make his debut with the national team. Later he was called up again against Netherlands and Belarus on 12 and 18 November.

Career statistics

Club

International

Style of play
An attacking-midfielder, capable of playing from the left and in a playmaker role, González possesses a good eye for a pass, and is able to beat defenders on occasion with his dribbling ability.

Honours
Monterrey
Liga MX: Apertura 2019
Copa MX: Apertura 2017, 2019–20
CONCACAF Champions League: 2019, 2021

Mexico Youth
FIFA U-17 World Cup: 2011
CONCACAF Olympic Qualifying Championship: 2015

References

External links
 
 
 
 
 

1994 births
Living people
Association football midfielders
Atlas F.C. footballers
C.F. Monterrey players
Liga MX players
Mexico youth international footballers
Mexico under-20 international footballers
Mexico international footballers
Footballers from Tamaulipas
People from Reynosa
Footballers at the 2016 Summer Olympics
Olympic footballers of Mexico
Mexican footballers